Richard Daniel "Ric" Killian is an American businessman, United States Army officer, and politician who served as a member of the North Carolina House of Representatives from 2007 to 2013.

Early life, education, and business career
Killian was born in Kaukauna, Wisconsin, in 1964. He was also raised there. In 1986, he earned a BS in organizational leadership from the United States Military Academy at West Point. He was a lieutenant/captain of the United States Army from 1986 to 1991. After that, he retired and has been a colonel in the U.S. Army Reserve since.

After retiring from the U.S. Army, Killian went into real estate. In 1995, he was named president of Howey Construction & Development and served until that position until 2000. He was then general manager of NVR until 2003. After that, he was vice president of Orleans Home builders until he was appointed to the North Carolina House of Representatives in 2006.

Early political career
In 1992, he was elected to the Kaukauna Area School District Board of Education and served one term. In 2004, he decided to run again to become a school board member, this time on the Mecklenburg Area Catholic School Board of Education.

North Carolina House of Representatives

Committee assignments
House Committee on Appropriations (Vice Chair)
House Committee on Education
House Committee on Elections
House Committee on Environment and Natural Resources
House Committee on Homeland Security, Military and Veterans Affairs (Chair)
House Committee on Judiciary
House Committee on Military and Homeland Security (Chair)
House Committee on Redistricting
House Committee on Transportation
House Subcommittee A (Judiciary)
House Subcommittee on Capital
House Subcommittee on Transportation (Chair)

Electoral history
In August 2006, incumbent Republican State Representative Doug Vinson, of North Carolina's 105th House District, decided not to run for a 2nd term. He was elected to the seat as a Republican unopposed. He won re-election unopposed in 2008 and 2010. He left office in 2013.

2010

2008

2006

2012 congressional election

After redistricting, Killian decided to retire from the state legislature to run for the newly redrawn North Carolina's 9th congressional district. He said "[Incumbent Sue Myrick] fought against runaway spending, and she always provided excellent service to her constituents, and that will continue if I am elected." U.S. Senator and 2008 Republican presidential nominee John McCain (R-AZ) endorsed Killian during the Republican primary in March 2012. Killian did not receive the nomination, which was won by Robert Pittenger.

Personal life
Ric married Debbi in 1991 and had four children. They are members of St. Matthew Catholic Church.

References

External links
Project Vote Smart - Representative Ric Killian (NC) profile

1964 births
Living people
People from Kaukauna, Wisconsin
Politicians from Charlotte, North Carolina
United States Army officers
United States Military Academy alumni
Military personnel from Wisconsin
21st-century American politicians
School board members in North Carolina
School board members in Wisconsin
Republican Party members of the North Carolina House of Representatives